Nesorohyla is a monotypic genus of frogs in the family Hylidae. The sole species is Nesorohyla kanaima, also known as the Kanaima treefrog. It is endemic to Guyana. and possibly Brazil and Venezuela. Its natural habitats are subtropical or tropical moist lowland forests, subtropical or tropical moist montane forests, and rivers.

References

Hylidae
Monotypic amphibian genera
Amphibians of Guyana
Endemic fauna of Guyana
Taxa named by Philippe J.R. Kok
Taxonomy articles created by Polbot